Ipieca is a global not-for-profit oil and gas industry association for environmental and social issues, headquartered in London. The association was established in 1974 as the International Petroleum Industry Environmental Conservation Association and changed its name in 2002.

Company members contribute to Ipieca's budget according to an individually agreed percentage based on the volume of crude oil produced and petroleum products sold by each company and the number of geographical areas where the company has interests.

Ipieca is the industry channel into UN's Intergovernmental Panel on Climate Change (IPCC) and the UNFCCC, both concerned with climate change. 

Its geographical coverage encompasses North America, Asia and the Pacific, Latin America and the Caribbean, Africa, Western Europe, Eastern Europe and the global energy market.

Beginning in the 1980s, the organization was involved in efforts to dispute climate science and weaken international climate policy.

See also
International Association of Oil & Gas Producers, set up at the same time and in the same place

References

External links
https://www.ipieca.org
Ipieca reporting table BP Sustainability Report 2016

Petroleum industry